Kim Suk Hoon (born April 15, 1972) is a South Korean actor. He graduated from the Theater Department of Chung-ang University. He has played an active part of The National Drama Company of Korea as an actor. His performance is characteristically delicate with an attention to details.
He also has profound knowledge in classical music.

Awards
1998 SBS Drama Awards: Best New Actor (Letters Written on a Cloudy Day)
1999 SBS Drama Awards: Excellence Award, Actor; Top 10 Stars (Tomato)
2004 MBC Drama Awards: Excellence Award, Actor (Ode to the Han River)
2009 KBS Drama Awards: Excellence Award, Actor in a Serial Drama (Empress Cheonchu)
2011 MBC Drama Awards: Top Excellence Award, Actor in a Serial Drama (Twinkle Twinkle)
2013 KBS Drama Awards: Excellence Award, Actor in a Daily Drama (Ruby Ring)
2015 Korea PD Awards: Radio Classic DJ Award (CBS, To Beautiful You)
2016 Korea Broadcasting Awards: Show Host Narrator Award (SBS, Your Curious Story)
2017 SBS Entertainment Awards: Best MC Award for Documentary Program (SBS, Your Curious Story)

Careers
2005 : The Honorary Spokesperson of Cheongju International Craft Biennale
2009 : The Honorary Spokesperson of Beautiful Store
2010 : The Honorary Spokesperson of The Jansen Exhibition in Korea
2011 : The Honorary Spokesperson of Seoul International Book Fair
2011 : The Honorary Spokesperson of The 92nd National Sports Festival in Goyang City

Filmography

Television series
Hong Gil-dong (SBS, 1998) - debut
Letters Written on a Cloudy Day (SBS, 1998)
Trap of Youth (SBS, 1999, cameo)
Tomato (SBS, 1999)
SWAT Police (SBS, 2000)
Man and Woman "Scissorhands" (SBS, 2001)
Affection (SBS, 2002)
Into the Storm (SBS, 2004)
Han River Ballad (MBC, 2004)
The Secret Lovers (MBC, 2005)
Exhibition of Fireworks (MBC, 2006, cameo)
Blissful Woman (KBS2, 2007)
Empress Cheonchu (KBS2, 2009)
Twinkle Twinkle (MBC, 2011)
Ruby Ring (KBS2, 2013)
Jingbirok (KBS1, 2015) Admiral Yi Sun-sin
My Mom (MBC, 2015)

Movie
The Chinese Restaurant Peking (1999)
The Gingko Bed 2 (2001)
Tube (2003)
So Cute (2004)
Magang Hotel (2007)
1724 Hero (2008)
Circle of Crime - Director's Cut (2012)

Theater
Flowed Swing (1998)
Twelfth Night by Shakespeare (1998)
The Turtle Ships (1998)
The True Story of Ah Q (1999)
Trip to Mui Island (1999)
An Intruder of Kobe (1999)
Hamlet (2001)
Art (2006)
The Mischief of Love and Coincidence - Le jeu de l'amour et du hasard(2007)
Long Day's Journey Into Night (2009)

Music Video
Kim Bum-soo - A Promise (1999)
Jo Sung-mo - A Thorn Tree (2000)
Lee Soo-young - And I Love You (2001)
F&F - Struggle (2006)
KCM - Three years later (2010)

Another Activity
Ballet : The Pirate (1998)
Musical : The King and I (2003)
Narration : Romantic Comics (2005)
Narration : Super Fish Documentary (2012)

Present Activity
Show Host : SBS, Your Curious Story (2010 ~)
A DJ : CBS, To Beautiful You (2011 ~2015)

References

External links
Agency Website 
Kim Suk Hoon International Fan Site - URI 

1972 births
Living people
Kakao M artists
Place of birth missing (living people)
South Korean male television actors
South Korean male film actors